William Derek Wylie (24 October 1918 – 29 September 1998) was the dean of the Royal College of Anaesthetists from 1967 to 1970.

References

Deans of the Royal College of Anaesthetists
English anaesthetists
1918 births
1998 deaths
Presidents of the Association of Anaesthetists